Moore Township is an inactive township in Oregon County, in the U.S. state of Missouri.

Moore Township has the name of John Moore, a pioneer citizen.

References

Townships in Missouri
Townships in Oregon County, Missouri